John Birley Abernethy (born 1947 in Wagga Wagga, Australia) is a former State Coroner of New South Wales.

Early life and education
John Birley Abernethy was born in Wagga Wagga, New South Wales in 1947. His father, Robert Neil Abernethy, was a bank officer; and his mother was a registered nurse. He has a younger sister, Myra who suffered from an illness which resulted in the family's relocating from rural New South Wales to Epping, a northern suburb of Sydney.

Abernethy attended Epping Public School and Epping Boys' High School. He completed the Leaving Certificate with strong results, allowing him to matriculate to university. In his final year of high school, he was elected a prefect of the school.

Abernethy earned a Graduate Diploma in Law, by correspondence, from the Bar Admission Board via the Law Extension Committee of the University of Sydney (BAB; now Legal Profession Admission Board (LPAB)).

Career
After leaving high school, In 1965, Abernethy joined the (then) Petty Sessions Branch of the New South Wales Department of Attorney General and Justice, where he worked until he became a Stipendiary Magistrate in 1984. For three years after his appointment as a Stipendiary Magistrate, Abernethy sat as a Relieving Magistrate and, later, as a Magistrate at Fairfield and Parramatta Local Courts.

In 1975, Abernethy was admitted to the Supreme Court of New South Wales as a Barrister-at-Law.

Magisterial career
In 1971, Abernethy was appointed Coroner for the State of New South Wales.

In 1984, Abernethy was appointed a Stipendiary Magistrate for New South Wales; a year later, he was appointed a Magistrate for New South Wales under the Local Courts Act 1982 (NSW), as a Magistrate of the Local Court of New South Wales.

Coronial career
In 1994, Abernethy was appointed New South Wales Deputy State Coroner; in 1996, he was appointed New South Wales Senior Deputy State Coroner; and, in 2000, he was appointed State Coroner of New South Wales. During his tenure as State Coroner, his office oversaw the inquest into the death of Vanessa Anderson; the inquest itself was presided over by Deputy State Coroner Carl Milovanovich.

Abernethy presided over the inquest into the death of Tegan Lane, the daughter of Australian water polo player Keli Lane.

Post-retirement
Following his retirement, Abernethy has commented on the car pursuits by the New South Wales Police Force, arguing in favour of them to prevent the escape of criminals.

Legal issues
In 2005, Abernethy was detected to have exceeded the legal speed limit of 40 km/h while driving in a school zone, resulting in the suspension of his driver's licence.

Personal life
Although born to and raised in a Presbyterian family, Abernethy left the church as a young man. In later life, he converted to Roman Catholicism.

Abernethy lives in West Pennant Hills, New South Wales.

References

External links
John Abernethy – State Coroner – Australian Museum

Australian barristers
Australian coroners
Australian magistrates
Australian people of Scottish descent
Australian Roman Catholics
Converts to Roman Catholicism from Presbyterianism
Living people
1947 births
People from Wagga Wagga